Yemma exilis is a species of stilt bug in the family Berytidae. It is found in eastern Asia, especially Korea and Japan.

References

External links

 

Berytidae